The Sergeants' Coup was a military coup d'état in Sierra Leone that occurred on 18 April 1968 against Chairman of the National Reformation Council (NRC) and acting Governor-General of Sierra Leone Brigadier Andrew Juxon-Smith, who declared himself the interim leader the year prior. The coup opened way for a 24-year-long All People's Congress dictatorship.

Background
In the general election of March 1967, Siaka Stevens' All People's Congress party won a plurality of parliamentary seats, defeating the Sierra Leone People’s Party (SLPP). Before taking office however, Stevens was arrested by Brigadier General David Lansana who demanded that tribal representatives be elected as well. The NRC eventually ousted Lansana and placed the government under permanent military rule.

The coup
The coup plotters were soldiers in the Republic of Sierra Leone Armed Forces who were dissatisfied with their low wages and poor conditions. They were part of the Anti-Corruption Revolutionary Movement (ACRM), who were led by Brigadier John Amadu Bangura, who served as Chief of the Defence Staff following the coup. Bangura took issue with the government collapsing after a series of coups that followed the hotly contested elections of March 1967.

The sergeants first formed in the town of Darn and then moved to the capital of Freetown. The ACRM imprisoned senior NRC members and arrested all high-ranking officers in the army and the police. Bangura, briefly served as head of state from 18 April to 22 April 1968. At least 12 people were killed as a result of the coup. On his last day in office, he gave the post of Prime Minister to Siaka Stevens after his predecessor Sir Henry Lightfoot Boston had declared the All People's Congress the winners of the election. At the same time, the Constitution of Sierra Leone was restored. After Steven's declared a one-party state, Bangura staged another military coup, this time it was unsuccessful. Bangura was later executed for treason. His cousin Tinga Seisay later became an active opponent of the Stevens government and a pro-democracy activist. It is largely seen as an example of a coup failing to accomplish its stated objectives by empowering a later autocratic government.

See also
List of coups and coup attempts
List of coups and coup attempts by country
1992 Sierra Leonean coup d'état

References

History of Sierra Leone
Politics of Sierra Leone
Military history of Sierra Leone
1968 in Sierra Leone
Conflicts in 1968
1960s coups d'état and coup attempts